Helicia ferruginea, commonly named hairy honeysuckle or rusty oak, is a species of rainforest trees, of eastern Australia, from the flowering plant family Proteaceae.

They are endemic to the rainforests of southeastern Queensland and northeastern New South Wales.

 this species has the official, current, Qld government conservation status of "vulnerable" species.

References

ferruginea
Proteales of Australia
Flora of Queensland
Flora of New South Wales
Taxa named by Ferdinand von Mueller